Tony John Windis (born January 27, 1933) is an American former NBA basketball player for the Detroit Pistons. Windis played college basketball at the University of Wyoming, where he ranks 2nd all time in the school's career scoring average with 21.2 ppg. He was drafted with the second pick in the fifth round of the 1959 NBA Draft. He appeared in nine games for the Detroit Pistons in the 1959-60 NBA season and he averaged 4.0 points per game, 5.2 rebounds per game and 3.6 assists per game.

References

1933 births
Living people
American men's basketball players
Basketball players from New York City
Detroit Pistons draft picks
Detroit Pistons players
Point guards
Wyoming Cowboys basketball players